Michael Anthony Worswick (born 14 March 1945) is an English former footballer who played for Burscough, Skelmersdale United, Chorley, Wigan Athletic and Barrow.

Career
Born in Preston, Lancashire, Worswick started his career as an amateur at Blackburn Rovers and Preston North End, but did not make any first team appearances. He went on to play for Burscough and Skelmersdale United in the Lancashire Combination, and played for Skelmersdale in the final of the 1966–67 FA Amateur Cup final.

He later played for Chorley and Wigan Athletic in the Northern Premier League, and was part of the Wigan team which was elected into the Football League in 1978. During the following season, he made his only Football League appearance as a substitute against Newport County.

References

External links
 The Non League memories of Mick Worswick

1945 births
Living people
Footballers from Preston, Lancashire
English footballers
Burscough F.C. players
Skelmersdale United F.C. players
Chorley F.C. players
Wigan Athletic F.C. players
Barrow A.F.C. players
Association football midfielders
England amateur international footballers